Zardari may refer to:
 Zardari (tribe), a Baloch tribe of Pakistan
 Zardari family, a Pakistani political family
Asif Ali Zardari (born 1955), former President of Pakistan
Hakim Ali Zardari, (1930–2011), a Pakistani politician and father of Asif Ali Zardari
Bilawal Bhutto Zardari (born 1988), chairman of the Pakistan Peoples Party, son of Asif Ali ZardariBhutto